The Federal Women's Film Program (FWFP) was created in 1980 by the Canadian government as a partnership of federal ministries and agencies to create and distribute films about the status of women. Studio D handled the administration of it in both French and English. Its creation was an attempt to address the “swelling demand for women-centered films and filmmaking opportunities”, as many female freelancers were becoming increasingly frustrated with the dozen staff members employed by Studio D who had the privilege of permanent positions. In 1987, the program was revived by executive producer Rina Fraticelli and was charged with “producing shorter, basic information films dealing with issues of immediate concern to Canadian women, including domestic violence, reproductive choice, career choice, health care, and aging”. A goal of the program was to direct more of Studio D's funds towards creative endeavours instead of being limited by distribution and other logistical details.  

The FWFP was associated with Studio D, but not part of its formal budgetary structure. Studio D provided leadership and personnel in developing FWFP, as well as sharing its physical space with the program. The National Film Board of Canada (NFB) matched funds provided by other federal departments to produce films related to women's issues. Some were internal training films, while others were related to important messages of each department's own goals.

 Agriculture and Agri-Food Canada
 Public Service Commission of Canada
 Status of Women Canada
 Environment Canada
 Justice Canada
 Health Canada - Seniors Secretariat - Family Violence - Prevention Division - Family and Child Health Programs
 Human Resources and Labour Canada - Women's Program - Status of Disabled Persons Secretariat - Women's Bureau - Employment of Equity Branch
 Ministry of Public Security
 Industry and Science Canada - Entrepreneurship and Small Business Office - Federal Business Development Bank - Federal Office of Regional Development (Quebec)

Significance 
Throughout the 1980s, the FWFP made a variety of films, including Not a Love Story: A Film About Pornography, an award-winning documentary on pornography and the sex trade. Other FWFP films have discussed nontraditional employment for women, employment for Indigenous women, and employment for disabled women. In 1986, the FWFP funded a film training project through Studio D, extending its mandate to provide training for women filmmakers.

Themes 
Themes covered by the FWFP productions are vast and varied, though the program's mandate was to ensure the production of timely films that reflected women's perspectives on current issues facing women and society. Some of the films focused on issues faced by young people as they assumed increasingly adult responsibilities. Issues explored included representation of women in the fields of math and science, the effects of violence in media on young consumers, and the challenges of unemployment. These documentaries were recommended for secondary school students and were accompanied by interactive guides for classroom participation. Other themes of FWFP productions included domestic abuse and services available to victims and tributes to Indigenous women.

Filmography

Stand-alone films 

Attention: Women at Work!, 1983. Directed by Anne Henderson, produced by Margaret Pettigrew. 28 min.
Head Start: Meeting the Computer Challenge, 1984. Directed and produced by Diane Beaudry. 27 min.
Doctor, Lawyer, Indian Chief, 1986. Directed by Carole Geddes, produced by Barbara Janes. 29 min.
The Impossible Takes a Little Longer, 1986. Directed by Anne Henderson, produced by Barbara Janes. 46 min.
No Time to Stop ,1990. Directed by Helene Klodawsky, produced by Chantal Bowen. 29 min.

Series 

 (International Youth Year Training Program) Co-produced by Micheline Le Guillou and Gerry Rogers.
Beyond Memory, 1986. Directed by Louise Lamarre. 14 min.
Children of War, 1986. Directed by Premika Ratnam. 25 min.
First Take Double Take, 1986. Directed by Paula Fairfield. 9 min.
Thin Dreams, 1986. Directed by Susie Mah. 21 min.
Next Step series. Directed by Tina Horne, co-produced by Gerry Rogers and Tina Horne.
Moving On, 1986. 28 min.
A Safe Distance, 1986. 28 min.
Sylvie's Story, 1986. 28 min.
Gathering Strength series.
In Her Chosen Field, 1989. Directed by Barbara Evans, produced by Chantal Bowen. 28 min.
A Time to Reap, 1989. Directed by Dagmar Teufel, produced by Chantal Bowen. 28 min.
Elder Women series. Produced by Chantal Bowen.
The Power of Time, 1989. Directed by Liette Aubin. 29 min.
Pills Unlimited, 1990. Directed by Sylvie Van Brabant. 29 min.
When the Day Comes, 1991. Directed by Sharon McGowan. 29 min.
Women and Work series. Produced by Chantal Bowen.
A Balancing Act, 1992. Directed by Helena Cynamon. 24 min.
The Glass Ceiling, 1992. Directed by Sophie Bissonnette, 28 min.
Careers to Discover, 1993. Directed by Ginette Pellerin. 24 min.
A Web Not a Ladder, 1993. Directed by Bonnie Dickie. 24 min.

Selected film synopses 
Enough is Enough (1996), directed by Nicole Giguere

Alternate Route (1997), directed by Denise Withers

Taking Charge (1996), directed by Claudette Jaiko

Awards and honours 

 The Impossible Takes a Little Longer (1987): Medikinale/International Medical and Scientific Film Festival - Prix Leonardo, Honourable Mention. Parma, Italy.

References

Further reading 
 National Film Board of Canada (1984). Beyond the Image: A Guide to Films about Women and Change. Montréal: National Film Board of Canada in collaboration with the Federal Women's Film Program. Accessed from: https://bac-lac.on.worldcat.org/oclc/54120458. 
 Vanstone, Gail (2007). D is for Daring: The Women Behind Studio D. Ottawa: Sumach Press.

External links 
 
 A Safe Distance on NFB
 A Safe Distance on Rise Up!
 A Safe Distance on YouTube
 
 Doctor, Lawyer, Indian Chief on NFB
 
 
 Moving On on NFB
 Sylvie's Story on NFB
 Sylvie's Story on YouTube
 The Impossible Takes a Longer on NFB Institutional Site
 

Women's film organizations
Film organizations in Canada
1980 establishments in Canada
Organizations established in 1980